Carex spilocarpa is a tussock-forming species of perennial sedge in the family Cyperaceae. It is native to Mexico and parts of Central America.

See also
List of Carex species

References

spilocarpa
Plants described in 1855
Taxa named by Ernst Gottlieb von Steudel
Flora of Mexico
Flora of Honduras
Flora of El Salvador